Back Again (Egyptian Arabic: رد قلبي translit: Rod Qalby aliases: My Heart is Returned or Return my Heart) is a 1957 Egyptian film directed by Ezz El-Dine Zulficar and written by Yusuf Sibai and Ezz El-Dine Zulficar. The film stars Shoukry Sarhan, Mariam Fakhr eddine, Salah Zulfikar, Hussein Riad and Hind Rostom. The film is listed in the Top 100 Egyptian films of the 20th century.

Synopsis
The film chronicles the story of a poor young man, the son of Janaini, named Ali (Shoukry Sarhan) and his brother Hussein (Salah Zulfikar), and Ali and his immortal love for a rich princess named Engy (Mariam Fakhr eddine) does not see the light of class discrimination, and her father's categorical rejection of that marriage. Their relationship becomes complicated when her father learns of this relationship, so he expels Ali's father, and Engy threatens that he will smite her lover if she does not back down. In fact, Engy backs down from the relationship and becomes engaged to someone else. Ali's life is turned upside down, and he and Engy's life becomes complicated; As he felt that Engy had betrayed him.

Crew
 Director: Ezz El-Dine Zulficar
 Story writer: Yusuf Sibai
 Screenplay: Ezz El-Dine Zulficar
 Producer: Asia Dagher
 Cinematographer: Wahid Farid
 Editor: Kamal Abu El Ela
 Music: Fouad El Zahery
 Studio: Lotus Film
 Distributor: Lotus Film

Cast
 Shoukry Sarhan: (Officer Ali Abdul Wahed)
 Mariam Fakhr eddine: (Princess Engy)
 Salah Zulfikar: (Officer Hussein Abdul Wahed)
 Hind Rostom: (The dancer Karima)
 Hussain Riad: (Al-Rais Abdul Wahed Al-ganaini, father of Ali and Hussein)
 Ferdoos Mohammed: (Mother of Ali and Hussein)
 Ahmed Allam: (Prince Ismail Kamal)
 Zahrat El-Ola: (Bahiya, the daughter of Ali's aunt and Hussain's wife)
 Ahmed Mazhar: (Prince Alaa, brother of Engy)
 Kamal Yassin: (Suleiman is Ali's best friend)
 Rushdy Abaza: (Refaat the friend of Ali and Hussein)
 Adly Kasseb
 Iskandar Mansi: (A colleague farmer and friend of Al-Rais Abdel Wahed)

In culture
Since its release in 1957, the film has been shown on the Egyptian state television on every 23 July  which is the  anniversary of  the 1952  revolution due to the fact that the main character, Ali, joined the Free Officers Movement which carried out the revolution.

See also
 Egyptian cinema
 Salah Zulfikar filmography
 List of Egyptian films of the 1950s

References

External links
 

1957 films
1950s Arabic-language films
20th-century Egyptian films
Egyptian romantic drama films
Films shot in Egypt
Films directed by Ezz El-Dine Zulficar